Manuel Sadosky (April 13, 1914 – June 18, 2005) was an Argentine mathematician, civil servant and author who was born in Buenos Aires to Jewish Russian immigrants who had fled the pogroms in Europe.

Bibliography 
Son of a shoemaker, Natalio Sadosky and his wife Maria Steingart of Ekaterinoslav (currently Dnipro), Ukraine, the family had arrived in Argentina in 1905.

Sadosky studied at the Mariano Acosta teachers school. Noted novelist Julio Cortázar was his classmate there, and remained a longtime friend. Since his childhood he was an ardent supporter of San Lorenzo de Almagro.  He married fellow mathematician and activist Cora Ratto de Sadosky (1912–1981) in 1937. Biographer Pablo Jacovkis has said that Cora, had a "powerful personality [that] was not overshadowed by her husband's." The couple had one child, mathematician Cora Sadosky (1940–2010).

Education 
Sadosky graduated as a Doctor in Physics and Mathematics at the University of Buenos Aires in 1940, under supervision of Esteban Terradas. He then moved to the Henri Poincaré Institute in Paris to pursue postdoctoral studies on a scholarship granted by the French Government. After another year in Italy, he returned to Argentina, where he faced complicated employment options because of his opposition to the Peronist regime.

After a coup d'état of 1955 removed President Juan Perón from office, Sadosky took up a position as professor at the University of Buenos Aires, where he was vice-dean of the Faculty of Exact and Natural Sciences from 1957 to 1966.

Computational Institute 
In 1960 he was commissioned to develop the Computational Institute (Instituto de Cálculo) of the university, home of Clementina, a new Ferranti Mercury computer and the first one installed in Argentina for research and education. His staff there included several excellent mathematicians including Cecilia Berdichevsky and Rebeca Cherep de Guber, and both would work closely with him for many years to come. 

He directed the institute until another coup d'état installed a military dictatorship in 1966, causing him to resign with the rest of the faculty in opposition to government intervention in the hitherto autonomous state universities (the Night of the Long Batons) and flee the country.

In exile 
He was later able to return to Argentina, but the Argentine Anticommunist Alliance death squad threatened to kill him so he fled with his family in 1974. He moved to Uruguay, finding employment in Montevideo at the Universidad de la República, where he continued publishing, helped to initiate computer studies and introduced the first research computer in that country.

With the eventual return of democracy to Argentina in 1983, president Raúl Alfonsín appointed him as Secretary of State of Science and Technology (until 1989).

One of his major contributions to computer science during this period, was the creation of the ESLAI (Latin American School of Higher Informatics).

Later years 
Dr. Manuel Sadosky died in Buenos Aires on June 18, 2005.

He was named an Illustrious Citizen of the City of Buenos Aires.

The Computer Science Department of the Faculty of Exact and Natural Sciences at the University of Buenos Aires is named after him.

Selected publications 

 Sadosky, Manuel, Cálculo numérico y gráfico, Buenos Aires: Ediciones Libreria del Colegio, 1952
 Sadosky, Manuel, Marx, hombre y revolucionario, Montevideo Libros de la pupila, 1969
 Sadosky, Manuel, Catalogo colectivo de publicaciones periodicas en las bibliotecas universitarias del Uruguay, Montevideo : Universidad de la Republica, 1972.
 Sadosky, Manuel; Sadosky, Cora, Complementos teóricos de los Elementos de calculo diferencial e integral de Manuel Sadosky, Rebeca Ch. de Guber, Buenos Aires: Alsina, 1974.
 Sadosky, Manuel; Guber, Rebeca Ch de, Elementos de cálculo diferencial e integral, Buenos Aires: Alsina, 1982.

References

External links
 Fundación Sadosky
 Obituary Pagina/12
 Obituary Clarín
 Secretaria de Ciencia y Tecnica
 Computer Science Department (FCEN-UBA) 

1914 births
2005 deaths
Academic staff of the University of Buenos Aires
Argentine Jews
Argentine mathematicians
Argentine people of Russian-Jewish descent
Illustrious Citizens of Buenos Aires
People from Buenos Aires
Jewish economists